LSCS may refer to:
 Lone Star College System
 Lower segment Caesarean section
 La Salle Computer Society, a professional student organization in De La Salle University College of Computer Studies